Laurel is an unincorporated community in Whatcom County, Washington, United States. It lies between the cities of Bellingham and Lynden on State Route 539.

References

Lynden, Washington
Unincorporated communities in Washington (state)
Unincorporated communities in Whatcom County, Washington